Kahn-Tineta Horn (born 16 April 1940, New York City) is a Mohawk political activist, civil servant, and former fashion model. Since 1972, she has held various positions in the social, community and educational development policy sections of the Canadian federal Department of Indian Affairs and Northern Development. She is a member of the Mohawk Bear Clan of Kahnawake.

Horn and her daughters were notable participants in the 1990 Oka Crisis. Her daughter, Waneek Horn-Miller (born 1975), was stabbed in the chest by a soldier's bayonet while holding her younger sister, Kaniehtiio, then aged 4; a photograph of the incident, published on the front page of newspapers, symbolized the standoff between Mohawks and the Canadian government. Waneek became a broadcaster, and co-captain of  Canada's first women's national water polo team at the 2000 Summer Olympics in Sydney. Kaniehtiio is now a film and television actress. Her eldest daughter, Dr. Ojistoh Horn, is a traditionally minded family medicine physician in Akwesasne.

Biography 
In the 1960s and early 1970s, Kahn-Tineta Horn became widely known for her criticisms of anti-native racism and government policy regarding First Nations peoples, and for her advocacy of native separatism. She was involved in the 1962 Conference on Indian Poverty in Washington D.C., the blocking of the International Bridge at Akwesasne in 1968, and other indigenous rights campaigns.

Kahn-Tineta caught the attention of the media in 1964, when she was "deposed as a Director of the National Indian Council, and as Indian Princess of Canada." By 1972, her separatist views had appeared in the pages of The Harvard Crimson and The New Yorker, and she had been interviewed by The Webster Reports of KVOS-TV, a Bellingham, Washington station which broadcasts to Vancouver, British Columbia.

Kahn-Tineta Horn has appeared in two short films, Artisans de notre histoire, Volume 2: Les Explorateurs (1995) and David Thompson: The Great Mapmaker (1964). She has served as publisher of the Mohawk Nation News. She has served as Director of the Canadian Alliance in Solidarity with Native Peoples and coordinator of the Free Wolverine Campaign.

In 2002, she gave a speech at the "You Are on Native Land Conference" at McGill University titled, How Canada violated the BNA Act to Steal Native Land: The Forgotten Arguments of Deskaheh.

In 2006, Kahn-Tineta Horn was one of two women who submitted a "notice of seizure" to the developers of the Melancthon Wind Farm near Shelburne, Ontario on behalf of the Haudenosaunee, and taught a history class at Concordia University in Montreal.

In 2008, at age 68, she suffered a heart attack while "handcuffed in a police stress hold" at the Cornwall/Akwesasne border crossing.

References

External links 
Kahn-Tineta Horn Speaking at Press Conference in 1964
1969 press photo Kahn-Tineta Horn Caughnawaga Princess
 Tehaliwaskenhas Bob Kennedy. The Turtle Island Native Network News; (News-Lasagna)
Peace Moccasins: Kahn-Tineta Horn-Mohawk Mother and Grandmother
Mohawk Nation News, 

How Canada violated the BNA Act to Steal Native Land: The Forgotten Arguments of Deskaheh, 2002 speech at McGill University

1940 births
Living people
American Mohawk people
First Nations activists
Canadian female models
Canadian civil servants
Concordia University people
Native American activists
20th-century First Nations people
21st-century First Nations people
Canadian Mohawk people
People from New York City
Mohawks of Kahnawá:ke
20th-century Canadian women